van Diest is a surname, and may refer to:

 Isala Van Diest (19th century), Belgian feminist
 Jan III van Diest (14th century), Dutch bishop
 Jan Baptist van Diest (late 17th century), Flemish painter
 Mike Van Diest (21st century), Carroll College football coach
 Peter van Diest (15th century), Dutch dramatist

Surnames of Dutch origin